Julian is a common male given name in the United States, Germany, Austria, the United Kingdom, Ireland, the Netherlands, France (as Julien), Italy (as Giuliano), Russia [Iulian (Yulian)] Spain, Latin America (as Julián in Spanish and Juliano or Julião in Portuguese), Iulian in Romanian and elsewhere.

The name is based on the Roman name Julianus, which was derived from Julius. This was the name of the Roman emperor Julian (4th century). It was also borne by several early saints, including the legendary Saint Julian the Hospitaller. This name has been used in England since the Middle Ages, at which time it was also a feminine name (from Juliana, eventually becoming Gillian).

Variations 
Some variations of the name are:

People
Notable people named Julian/Julien include:

Antiquity

Marcus Antonius Julianus, a procurator of Judea from 66 to 70 AD during the time of the First Jewish–Roman War
Tettius Julianus,  commander of a legion under Marcus Aponius Saturninus
Salvius Julianus (c.110–c.170), Roman jurist, often cited in legal texts as 'Julian' or 'Julianus'
Didius Julianus  (133 or 137–193), Roman emperor (rarely known as Julian I.)
Gaius Asinius Nicomachus Julianus (born 185), Proconsul of Asia
Julian of Pannonia, Roman usurper
Julius Julianus , grandfather of the emperor Julian, Roman administrator under Constantine the Great
Amnius Anicius Julianus, politician of the Roman Empire
Julian (emperor) (332–363), Flavius Claudius Julianus, Roman emperor (rarely known as Julian II.)
Julianus Pomerius, a Christian priest in fifth century Gaul
Julian of Eclanum, Italian Christian bishop
Julianus ben Sabar (Julian ben Sabar), leader of the Samaritans
Julian, Count of Ceuta, Visigothic hero/traitor

Arts
Julian Adams, American actor
Julian Edwin Adderley, better known as Cannonball Adderley, American jazz musician
Julian Austin, Canadian musician
Julian Bahula, South African drummer, composer and bandleader
Julien Baker, American musician (female)
Julian Barnes, English novelist
Julian Barratt, English actor, comedian, and musician
Julian Bleach English actor
Julian Bream, English classical musician
Julian Casablancas, American rock musician
Julian Clary, English comedian
Julian Cochran, English classical composer
Julian Cope, English rock musician
Sean Julian Danielsen, guitarist and lead vocalist for American rock bands Smile Empty Soul and World Fire Brigade
Julien Dillens, Belgian sculptor
Julien Duvivier, French film director
Julian Fellowes, English actor, novelist, film director, screenwriter and Conservative Party life peer
Julian Glover, English actor
Julien Green, American novelist (French-born and wrote in French)
Julian Hamilton, Australian musician
Julian Miles Holland, better known as Jools Holland, musician
Julien Josephson, American screenwriter
Julian Koster, American musician
Julian Kostov, Bulgarian actor, filmmaker, and athlete
Julien Leclercq, French poet and art critic
Julian Lennon, English musician
Julian Lloyd Webber, English cellist
Julian Marley, English/Jamaican musician
Julian May, American fiction writer (female)
Julian McMahon, Australian actor and model
Julian Mitchell, English screenwriter, novelist
Julian Morris, English actor
Julian Morrow, Australian comedian
Julian Opie, English artist
Julian Rachlin, Lithuanian Jewish / Austrian classical musician
Julian Rhind-Tutt, English actor
Julian Richards, Welsh film director
Julian Rogers, Caribbean broadcaster and journalist
Julian Sands, English actor
Julian Scanlan, electronic music producer and DJ known as Slushii
Julian Simon, American professor and author
Julian Slade, English composer
Julien Temple, English documentary, film, and music video director
Julian Trevelyan, English artist and poet
Julian Turner, American singer
Julian Tuwim, Polish poet

Politics
Julian Assange (born 1971), Australian Internet activist
Julian Bond (1940–2015), African American civil rights leader
Julian Bushoff (born 1997), Dutch politician
Julian Castro (born 1974), American politician
Julien Chouinard, French Canadian lawyer and judge
Julian Dufreche, Clerk of Court and President of the Board of Election Supervisors for Tangipahoa Parish, Louisiana
Julian B. Erway (1899–1970), New York politician
Julian Hartridge, American politician
Julien Lahaut, Belgian politician and political activist
Julián García Vargas, Spanish politician
Julian Reed, Canadian politician
Julian Robinson, Jamaican politician

Religion
St. Julian of Toledo (642–690), a Christian saint
Julian, bishop of Zaragoza (Spain) in 1077–1110
St. Julian the Hospitaller, legendary Roman Catholic saint
St. Julian of Le Mans, venerated as first bishop of Le Mans
Julian of Norwich (1342 –  1413), woman English mystic
Sts. Julian and Basilissa, fourth-century martyrs
Julian of Eclanum (c. 386 – c. 455), bishop of Eclanum, leader of the Pelagians
Julian of Antioch (of Cilicia, of Anazarbus)
Friar Julian,  Hungarian Dominican friar, explorer
Julian I of Antioch, Syriac Orthodox patriarch
Julien Mory Sidibé, Malian bishop

Sciences
Julian W. Hill (1904–1996), American chemist, inventor of nylon
Julian Huxley, English biologist and first director of UNESCO
Julian Jaynes, 20th-century American psychologist
Julian Ochorowicz, Polish philosopher, psychologist, inventor and publicist
Julien Offray de La Mettrie, French physician and philosopher
Julian Schwinger, Nobel Prize winning American physicist

Sports
Julien Arias, French rugby footballer
Julian Austin, Canadian field hockey player
Julian Blackmon (born 1998), American football player
Julian Brandt, German footballer
Julian Champagnie (born 2001), American basketball player
Julian Draxler, German footballer
Julian Dunn (born 2000), Canadian soccer player
Julian Edelman (born 1986), American football player
Julian Fleming (born 2000), American football player
Julian Forte (born 1993), Jamaican sprinter
Julien Fountain, English cricket coach
Julian Gamble (born 1989), American basketball player in the Israeli Basketball Premier League
Julian Golley, English athlete
Julian Hodgson, English chess grandmaster and former British champion
Julian Illingworth, American squash professional
Julian Jasinski, German basketball player
Julian Jenkins, American football player
Julian Kelly, English-born Irish footballer
Julian Krinsky, American, former South African, professional tennis player
Julien Lorcy, French boxer
Julian Love (born 1998), American football player
Julian Merryweather (born 1991), American professional baseball player
Julián Morrinson, Cuban discus thrower
Julian Nagelsmann, German football manager 
Julian Okwara (born 1997), American football player
Julián Sotelo, Spanish javelin thrower
Julian Spence, American football player
Julian Wade (born 1990), Dominican footballer
Julianus Wagemans (1890–1965), Belgian gymnast who competed in the 1920 Summer Olympics
Julian Weigl, German football player
Julian Wilson (1940–2014), former BBC horse-racing correspondent
Julian Wilson (surfer) (born 1988), Australian surfer
Julian Wright (born 1987), American basketball player
Julian Yee (born 1997), first Malaysian figure skater to compete in the Olympics

Other
Julian Cook (1916–1990), distinguished American Army officer of World War II who gained fame for his crossing of the Waal river during Operation Market Garden in September 1944
Julian N. Frisbie, American General, commanding officer of the 7th Marine Regiment during the Battle of Cape Gloucester, warden of Southern Michigan Prison during 1952 riots
Julian Hodge (1904–2004), English/Welsh banker, businessman
Julian Knight (born 1968), Australian mass murderer
Julian Smith (disambiguation), multiple people
Julian Pottage, renowned Bridge player

Fictional
Julian Sark, fictional character of the television series Alias
Dr. Julian Bashir, chief medical officer of Star Trek: Deep Space Nine
Julian, a main character in the Canadian mockumentary Trailer Park Boys
Julian "Bean" Delphiki, one of the main characters in Orson Scott Card's Ender's Game series
King Julien XIII, Lord-of-the-Lemurs, a character from the animated Madagascar movie franchise and the TV cartoon series The Penguins of Madagascar
Julian Konzern, character from the anime and manga series Beyblade: Metal Masters
Julian Blackthorn, protagonist of Cassandra Clare's series The Dark Artifices
Julian Kintobor, now known as Ivo Robotnik, the primary antagonist of the Sonic series
Julian Baker, character on the CW television series One Tree Hill
Julian and Sandy were regular characters in BBC Radio comedy Round the Horne
Julian, a supporting character in Ice Age: Collision Course
Julian Star, the Cardcaptors name for the Cardcaptor Sakura character Yukito Tsukishiro, voiced by Sam Vincent
Julian Clifton, character in Postman Pat and Special Delivery Service
Julian Pearce, main character of Apple TV show Servant

See also

Jolyon
Jullien
Juliano (given name)
Julian (surname)

References

English masculine given names
Albanian masculine given names